Alun may refer to:

Places
 Alun, a village in Boșorod Commune, Hunedoara County, Romania
 Alun (Hungarian: Álun), a village in Bunila Commune, Hunedoara County, Romania
 Alun River, Romania
 Afon Alun, a river in the Vale of Glamorgan, Wales
 River Alyn, also known as the River Alun, Wales
 River Alun, Pembrokeshire, Wales

Other uses
 Alun (given name)

See also
 Alun-alun, Javanese architectural term for the large central open lawn squares common to villages, towns and cities in Indonesia